Ruriko (written: ,  or ) is a feminine Japanese given name. Notable people with the name include:

, Japanese voice actress and singer
, Japanese actress
, Japanese classical pianist
, Japanese television personality, gravure idol and sportscaster
, Japanese Japanese middle-distance runner 
, Japanese voice actress 
Ruriko Yoshida, Japanese-American mathematician and statistician

See also
4455 Ruriko, a main-belt asteroid named for Ruriko Ueda, wife of one of the discoverers

Japanese feminine given names